Gifted education (also known as gifted and talented education (GATE), talented and gifted programs (TAG), or G/T education) is a broad group of special practices, procedures, and theories used in the education of children who have been identified as gifted or talented.

The main approaches to gifted education are enrichment and acceleration. An enrichment program teaches additional, related material, but keeps the student progressing through the curriculum at the same rate as other students. For example, after the gifted students have completed the normal work in the curriculum, an enrichment program might provide them with additional information about a subject. An acceleration program advances the student through the standard curriculum faster than normal. This is done through many different approaches.

There is no standard global definition of what a gifted student is; multiple definitions exist. Most definitions select the students who are the most skilled or talented in a given area, e.g., the students with the most skill or talent in music, language, logical reasoning, or mathematics. The percentage of students selected varies, generally with 10% or fewer being selected for gifted education programs. However, since students vary in their aptitudes and achievements, a student who is not gifted in one area, such as music, may be considered gifted in another, such as language. Consequently, even if all programs agreed to include only the top 5% of students in their area, more than just 5% of students would be identified as gifted.

Forms
Attempts to provide gifted education can be classified in several ways. Most gifted students benefit from a combination of approaches at different times.

Acceleration

Pupils are advanced to a higher-level class covering material more suited to their abilities and preparedness. This may take the form of skipping grades or completing the normal curriculum in a shorter-than-normal period of time ("telescoping"). Subject acceleration (also called partial acceleration) is a flexible approach that can advance a student in one subject, such as mathematics or language, without changing other studies, such as history or science. This type of acceleration is usually based upon achievement testing, rather than IQ.

Some colleges offer early entrance programs that give gifted younger students the opportunity to attend college early. In the U.S., many community colleges allow advanced students to enroll with the consent of school officials and the pupil's parents.

Acceleration presents gifted children with academic material from established curricula that is commensurate with their ability and preparedness, and for this reason is a low-cost option from the perspective of the school. This may result in a small number of children taking classes targeted at older children. For the majority of gifted students, acceleration is beneficial both academically and socially. Whole grade skipping is considered rapid acceleration. Some advocates have argued that the disadvantages of being retained in a standard mixed-ability classroom are substantially worse than any shortcomings of acceleration. For example, psychologist Miraca Gross reports: "the majority of these children [retained in a typical classroom] are socially rejected [by their peers with typical academic talents], isolated, and deeply unhappy. Children of IQ 180+ who are retained in the regular classroom are even more seriously at risk and experience severe emotional distress." These accelerated children should be placed together in one class if possible. Research suggests that acceleration might have an impact long after students graduate from high school. For example, one study shows that high-IQ individuals who experienced full-grade acceleration earned higher incomes as adults.

Cluster grouping
Cluster grouping is the gathering of four to six gifted and talented and/or high achieving students in a single classroom for the entire school day. Cluster teachers are specially trained in differentiating for gifted learners. Clusters are typically used in upper elementary grades. Within a cluster group, instruction may include enrichment and extensions, higher-order thinking skills, pretesting and differentiation, compacting, an accelerated pace, and more complexity in content.

Colloquium
Like acceleration, colloquium provides advanced material for high school students. In colloquium, students take Advanced Placement (AP) courses. However, colloquium is different from AP classes because students are usually given more projects than students in AP classes. Students in colloquium also generally study topics more in depth and sometimes in a different way than students enrolled in AP classes do. Colloquium is a form that takes place in a traditional public school. In colloquium, subjects are grouped together. Subjects are taught at different times of the day; however, usually what is being taught in one subject will connect with another subject. For example, if the students are learning about colonial America in History, then they might also be analyzing text from The Scarlet Letter in English. Some schools may only have colloquium in certain subjects. In schools where colloquium is only offered in English and History, colloquium students usually take Advanced Placement courses in math and science and vice versa.

Compacting
In compacting, the regular school material is compacted by pretesting the student to establish which skills and content have already been mastered. Pretests can be presented on a daily basis (pupils doing the most difficult items on a worksheet first and skipping the rest if they are performed correctly), or before a week or longer unit of instructional time. When a student demonstrates an appropriate level of proficiency, further repetitive practice can be safely skipped, thus reducing boredom and freeing up time for the student to work on more challenging material.

Enrichment
On the primary school level, students spend all class time with their peers, but receive extra material to challenge them. Enrichment may be as simple as a modified assignment provided by the regular classroom teacher, or it might include formal programs such as Odyssey of the Mind, Destination Imagination or academic competitions such as Brain Bowl, Future Problem Solving, Science Olympiad, National History Day, science fairs, or spelling bees. Programmes of enrichment activities may also be organised outside the school day (e.g. the ASCEND project in secondary science education). This work is done in addition to, and not instead of, any regular school work assigned. Critics of this approach argue that it requires gifted students to do more work instead of the same amount at an advanced level. On the secondary school level sometimes an option is to take more courses such as English, Spanish, Latin, philosophy, or science or to engage in extracurricular activities. Some perceive there to be a necessary choice between enrichment and acceleration, as if the two were mutually exclusive alternatives. However, other researchers see the two as complements to each other.

Full-time separate classes or schools

Some gifted students are educated in either a separate class or a separate school. These classes and schools are sometimes called "congregated gifted programs" or "dedicated gifted programs."

Some independent schools have a primary mission to serve the needs of the academically gifted. Such schools are relatively scarce and often difficult for families to locate. One resource for locating gifted schools in the United States can be found on the National Association for Gifted Children's "Resource Directory" accessible through their home page. Such schools often need to work to guard their mission from occasional charges of elitism, support the professional growth and training of their staff, write curriculum units that are specifically designed to meet the social, emotional, and academic talents of their students, and educate their parent population at all ages.

Some gifted and talented classes offer self-directed or individualized studies, where the students lead a class themselves and decide on their own task, tests, and all other assignments. These separate classes or schools tend to be more expensive than regular classes, due to smaller class sizes and lower student-to-teacher rations. Not-for-profit (non-profit) schools often can offer lower costs than for-profit schools. Either way, they are in high demand and parents often have to pay part of the costs.

Hobby
Activities such as reading, creative writing, sport, computer games, chess, music, dance, foreign languages, and art give an extra intellectual challenge outside of school hours.

Homeschooling
An umbrella term encompassing a variety of educational activities conducted at home, including those for gifted children: part-time schooling; school at home; classes, groups, mentors and tutors; and unschooling. In many US states, the population of gifted students who are being homeschooled is rising quite rapidly, as school districts responding to budgetary issues and standards-based policies are cutting what limited gifted education programs remain in existence, and families seek educational opportunities that are tailored to each child's unique needs.

Pull-out 

Gifted students are pulled out of a heterogeneous classroom to spend a portion of their time in a gifted class. These programs vary widely, from carefully designed half-day academic programs to a single hour each week of educational challenges. Generally, these programs are ineffective at promoting academic advancement unless the material covered contains extensions and enrichment to the core curriculum. The majority of pull-out programs include an assortment of critical thinking drills, creative exercises, and subjects typically not introduced in standard curricula. Much of the material introduced in gifted pull-out programs deals with the study of logic, and its application to fields ranging from philosophy to mathematics. Students are encouraged to apply these empirical reasoning skills to every aspect of their education both in and outside of class.

Self-pacing
Self-pacing methods, such as the Montessori Method, use flexible grouping practices to allow children to advance at their own pace. Self-pacing can be beneficial for all children and is not targeted specifically at those identified as gifted or talented, but it can allow children to learn at a highly accelerated rate. Directed Studies are usually based on self-pacing.

Summer enrichment 
These offer a variety of courses that mainly take place in the summer. Summer schools are popular in the United States. Entrance fees are required for such programs, and programs typically focus on one subject, or class, for the duration of the camp.

Several examples of this type of program are:

Center for Talented Youth
CTYI
GERI: Gifted Education Resource Institute, Purdue University
Johns Hopkins University
Center for Talent Development, Northwestern University

Within the United States, in addition to programs designed by the state, some counties also choose to form their own Talented and Gifted Programs. Sometimes this means that an individual county will form its own TAG program; sometimes several counties will come together if not enough gifted students are present in a single county. Generally, a TAG program focuses on a specific age group, particularly the local TAG programs. This could mean elementary age, high school age, or by years such as ages 9 through 14.

These classes are generally organized so that students have the opportunity to choose several courses they wish to participate in. Courses offered often vary between subjects, but are not typically strictly academically related to that subject. For example, a TAG course that could be offered in history could be the students learning about a certain event and then acting it out in a performance to be presented to parents on the last night of the program. These courses are designed to challenge the students to think in new ways and not merely to be lectured as they are in school.

Identifying gifted children

The term "Gifted Assessment" is typically applied to a process of using norm-referenced psychometric tests administered by a qualified psychologist or psychometrist with the goal of identifying children whose intellectual functioning is significantly advanced as compared to the appropriate reference group (i.e., individuals of their age, gender, and country). The cut-off score for differentiating this group is usually determined by district school boards and can differ slightly from area to area, however, the majority defines this group as students scoring in the top 2 percentiles on one of the accepted tests of intellectual (cognitive) functioning or IQ. Some school boards also require a child to demonstrate advanced academic standing on individualized achievement tests and/or through their classroom performance. Identifying gifted children is often difficult but is very important because typical school teachers are not qualified to educate a gifted student. This can lead to a situation where a gifted child is bored, underachieves and misbehaves in class.

Individual IQ testing is usually the optimal method to identify giftedness among children. However it does not distinguish well among those found to be gifted. Therefore, examiners prefer using a variety of tests to first identify giftedness and then further differentiate. This is often done by using individual IQ tests and then group or individual achievement tests. There is no standard consensus on which tests to use, as each test is better suited for a certain role.

The two most popular tests for identifying giftedness in the school-age population are the WISC IV and the SB5. The WIAT III is considered the most popular academic achievement test to determine a child's aggregate learned knowledge.

Although a newer WISC version, the WISC V, was developed in late 2014, the WISC IV is still the most commonplace test. It has been translated into several languages including Spanish, Portuguese, Norwegian, Swedish, French, German, Dutch, Japanese, Chinese, Korean, and Italian. The WISC-IV assesses a child's cognitive abilities, with respect to age group. Coupled with results from other tests, the WISC accurately depicts a child's developmental and psychological needs for the future.

The SB5 is an intelligence test that determines cognitive abilities and can be administered to persons in virtually any age group. It assesses a series of intelligence indicators including fluid reasoning, general knowledge, quantitative reasoning, spatial processing, and working memory. The SB5 makes use of both verbal and nonverbal testing.

The WIAT-III cannot assess all components of learned knowledge, but does give an understanding of a child's ability to acquire skills and knowledge through formal education. This test measures aspects of the learning process that take place in a traditional school setting in reading, writing, math, and oral language. Although the WIAT-III tests a wide range of material, it is designed primarily to assess children's learning before adolescence.

Versions of these tests exist for each age group. However it is recommended to begin assessment as early as possible, with approximately eight years of age being the optimal time to test. Testing allows identification of specific needs of students and help to plan an education early.

Out-of-group achievement testing (such as taking the SAT or ACT early) can also help to identify these students early on (see SMPY) and is implemented by various talent search programs in use by education programs. Out-of-group testing can also help to differentiate children who have scored in the highest percentiles in a single IQ test.

Testing alone cannot accurately identify every gifted child. Teacher and parent nominations are essential additions to the objective information provided by grades and scores. Parents are encouraged to keep portfolios of their children's work, and documentation of their early signs of gifted behavior.

Studies of giftedness

The development of early intelligence tests by Alfred Binet led to the Stanford-Binet IQ test developed by Lewis Terman. Terman began long-term studies of gifted children with a view to checking if the popular view "early ripe, early rot" was true. The Terman Genetic Studies of Genius longitudinal study has been described by successor researchers who conducted the study after Terman's death and also by an independent researcher who had full access to the study files.

Modern studies by James and Kulik conclude that gifted students benefit least from working in a mixed-level class, and benefit most from learning with other similarly advanced students in accelerated or enriched classes.

Definition of giftedness
Educational authorities differ on the definition of giftedness: even when using the same IQ test to define giftedness, they may disagree on what gifted means—one may take up the top 2 percent of the population, another might take up the top 5 percent of a population, which may be within a state, district, or school. Within a single school district, there can be substantial differences in the distribution of measured IQ. The IQ for the top percentile at a high-performing school may be quite different from that at a lower performing school.

Peter Marshall obtained his doctorate in 1995, for research carried out in this field in the years from 1986. At the time, he was the first Research Director of the Mensa Foundation for Gifted Children. His work challenged the difficult childhood hypothesis, concluding that gifted children, by and large, do not have any more difficult childhoods than mainstream children and, in fact, that where they do, their giftedness probably helps them cope better than mainstream children and provided the material for his subsequent book Educating a Gifted Child.

In Identifying Gifted Children: A Practical Guide, Susan K. Johnsen (2004) explains that gifted children all exhibit the potential for high performance in the areas included in the United States federal definition of gifted and talented students:

The National Association for Gifted Children in the United States defines giftedness as:

This definition has been adopted in part or completely by the majority of the states in the United States. Most have some definition similar to that used in the State of Texas, whose definition states:

The major characteristics of these definitions are (a) the diversity of areas in which performance may be exhibited (e.g., intellectual, creative, artistic, leadership, academic), (b) the comparison with other groups (e.g., those in general education classrooms or of the same age, experience, or environment), and (c) the use of terms that imply a need for development of the gift (e.g., capability and potential).

Reliance on IQ
In her book, Identifying Gifted Children: A Practical Guide, Susan K. Johnsen (2004) writes that schools should use a variety of measures of students' capability and potential when identifying gifted children. These measures may include portfolios of student work, classroom observations, achievement measures, and intelligence scores. Most educational professionals accept that no single measure can be used in isolation to accurately identify every gifted child.

Even if the notion of IQ is generally useful for identifying academically talented students who would benefit from further services, the question of the cutoff point for giftedness is still important. As noted above, different authorities often define giftedness differently.

History

Classical era to Renaissance
Gifted and talented education dates back thousands of years. Plato (c. 427–c. 347 BCE) advocated providing specialized education for intellectually gifted young men and women. In China's Tang Dynasty (580-618 CE), child prodigies were summoned to the imperial court for specialized education. Throughout the Renaissance, those who exhibited creative talent in art, architecture, and literature were supported by both the government and private patronage.

Francis Galton

Francis Galton conducted one of the earliest Western studies of human intellectual abilities. Between 1888 and 1894, Galton tested more than 7,500 individuals to measure their natural intellectual abilities. He found that if a parent deviates from the norm, so will the child, but to a lesser extent than the parent. This was one of the earliest observed examples of regression toward the mean. Galton believed that individuals could be improved through interventions in heredity, a movement he named eugenics. He categorized individuals as gifted, capable, average, or degenerate, and he recommended breeding between the first two categories, and forced abstinence for the latter two. His term for the most intelligent and talented people was "eminent". After studying England's most prominent families, Galton concluded that one's eminence was directly related to the individual's direct line of heredity.

Lewis Terman
At Stanford University in 1918, Lewis Terman adapted Alfred Binet's Binet-Simon intelligence test into the Stanford-Binet test, and introduced intelligence quotient (IQ) scoring for the test. According to Terman, the IQ was one's mental age compared to one's chronological age, based on the mental age norms he compiled after studying a sample of children. He defined intelligence as "the ability to carry on abstract thinking". During World War I Terman was a commissioned officer of the United States Army, and collaborated with other psychologists in developing intelligence tests for new recruits to the armed forces. For the first time, intelligence testing was given to a wide population of drafted soldiers.

After the war, Terman undertook an extensive longitudinal study of 643 children in California who scored at IQ 140 or above, the Genetic Studies of Genius, continuing to evaluate them throughout their lives. Subjects of these case studies were called "Termites" and the studies contacted the children in 1921, and again in 1930, 1947, and 1959 after his death. Terman's studies have to date been the most extensive on high-functioning children, and are still quoted in psychological literature today. Terman claimed to have disproven common misconceptions, such as that highly intelligent children were prone to ill physical and mental health, that their intelligence burned out early in their lives, or that they either achieved greatly or underachieved.

Leta Hollingworth
A professional colleague of Terman's, Leta Hollingworth was the first in the United States to study how best to serve students who showed evidence of high performance on tests. Although recognizing Terman's and Galton's beliefs that heredity played a vital role in intelligence, Hollingworth gave similar credit to home environment and school structure. Hollingworth worked to dispel the pervasive belief that "bright children take care of themselves" and emphasized the importance of early identification, daily contact, and grouping gifted children with others with similar abilities. Hollingworth performed an 18-year-long study of 50 children in New York City who scored 155 or above on the Stanford-Binet, and studied smaller groups of children who scored above a 180. She also ran a school in New York City for bright students that employed a curriculum of student-led exploration, as opposed to a teacher providing students with a more advanced curriculum they would encounter later in life.

Cold War
One unforeseen result of the launch of Sputnik by the Soviet Union was the immediate emphasis on education for bright students in the United States, and this settled the question whether the federal government should get involved in public education at all. The National Defense Education Act (NDEA) was passed by Congress in 1958 with $1 billion US to bolster science, math, and technology in public education. Educators immediately pushed to identify gifted students and serve them in schools. Students chosen for gifted services were given intelligence tests with a strict cutoff, usually at 130, which meant that students who scored below 130 were not identified.

Marland Report
The impact of the NDEA was evident in schools for years after, but a study on how effective education was meeting the needs of gifted students was initiated by the United States Department of Education in 1969. The Marland Report, completed in 1972, for the first time presented a general definition of giftedness, and urged districts to adopt it. The report also allowed students to show high functioning on talents and skills not measurable by an intelligence test. The Marland Report defined gifted as 

The report's definition continues to be the basis of the definition of giftedness in most districts and states.

A Nation at Risk
In 1983, the result of an 18-month-long study of secondary students was published as A Nation at Risk, and claimed that students in the United States were no longer receiving superior education, and in fact, could not compete with students from other developed countries in many academic exercises. One of the recommendations the book made was to increase services to gifted education programs, citing curriculum enrichment or acceleration specifically. The US federal government was also urged to create standards for the identification and servicing of gifted students.

Jacob Javits Gifted and Talented Students Education Act
The Jacob Javits Gifted and Talented Students Education Act was passed in 1988 as part of the Elementary and Secondary Education Act (ESEA). Instead of funding district-level gifted education programs, the Javits Act instead has three primary components: the research of effective methods of testing, identification, and programming, which is performed at the National Research Center on the Gifted and Talented; the awarding of grants to colleges, states, and districts that focus on underrepresented populations of gifted students; and grants awarded to state and districts for program implementation.

Annual funding for grants must be passed by US Congress, and totaled $9.6 million US in 2007, but the money is not promised. While he was president, George W. Bush eliminated the money every year of his term, but members of Congress overrode the president to make sure the grant money was distributed.

No Child Left Behind
The most recent US federal education initiative was signed into law in 2002. The goal of No Child Left Behind (NCLB) is to bring the proficiency of all students to grade level but critics note it does not address the needs of gifted students who perform above grade level. The act imposes punishments on schools, administrators, and teachers when students do not achieve to the plan's designs, but does not address any achievement standards for high-functioning students, forcing schools and teachers to spend their time with low-achieving students. An article in The Washington Post declared, "The unmistakable message to teachers -- and to students -- is that it makes no difference whether a child barely meets the proficiency standard or far exceeds it." Gifted services have been recently eroding as a result of the new legislation, according to a 2006 article in The New York Times.

A Nation Deceived
In 2004, the John Templeton Foundation sponsored a report titled A Nation Deceived: How Schools Hold Back America's Brightest Students, highlighting the disparity between the research on acceleration (which generally supports it, both from an academic and a psychological point of view), and the educational practices in the US that are often contrary to the conclusions of that research. The Institute for Research and Policy on Acceleration (IRPA) was established in 2006 at The Connie Belin and Jacqueline N. Blank International Center for Gifted Education and Talent Development at the University of Iowa College of Education through the support of the John Templeton Foundation following the publication of this report.

Global implementation

Australia

Public gifted education in Australia varies significantly from state to state. New South Wales has 95 primary schools with opportunity classes catering to students in year 5 and 6. New South Wales also has 17 fully selective secondary schools and 25 partially selective secondary schools. Western Australia has selective programs in 17 high schools, including Perth Modern School, a fully selective school. Queensland has 3 Queensland Academies catering to students in years 10,11 and 12. South Australia has programs in 3 public high schools catering to students in years 8,9 and 10, including Glenunga International High School. The Victorian Government commissioned a parliamentary inquiry into the education of gifted and talented children in 2012. One recommendation from the inquiry was for the Victorian Government to list the schools with programs, but the government has not implemented this recommendation. Some private schools have developed programs for gifted children.

Brazil
The Centre for Talent and Potential Development (CEDET) is a special education center created by Zenita Guenther in Lavras, MG, Brazil, in 1993. CEDET is run by the Lavras School System with technical and civil responsibility delegated to the Association of Parents and Friends for Supporting Talent (ASPAT). Its main goal is to cultivate the proper physical and social environment for complementing and supplementing educational support to the gifted and talented student. At present, there are 512 gifted students age 7 to 17 enrolled at CEDET, around 5% of Lavras Basic School population. The students come from thirteen Municipal Schools, eight State Schools and two private schools, plus a group of students from nearby communities brought in by their families.

Canada

In Alberta, the Calgary Board of Education (CBE) has various elementary, middle and high schools offering the GATE Program, standing for Gifted and Talented Education, for Grades 4–12, or Divisions 2–4. The program for students, who, through an IQ test, ranked in the Very Superior Range; falling into Gifted or Genius. For each of the three divisions, there are 2 schools offering GATE, one for the North Side of the city (CBE Areas I, II and III) and one for the South Side (CBE Areas IV and V). For Division 2, or Grades 4–6, it is available at Hillhurst Elementary School for the North and Nellie McClung Elementary School for the South. For Division 3, or Grades 7–9, it is available at Queen Elizabeth High School for the North and John Ware Junior High School for the South. For Division 3, or Grades 10–12, Queen Elizabeth High School, which is a joint Junior High-Senior High offers it for the North and Henry Wise Wood Senior High School offers it for the south. GATE classes go more in-depth and cover some curriculum for the following grade level, with tougher assignments and a faster learning pace. Students benefit from being around other students like them. These students attend the school alongside regular students and those in other programs (e.g. IB and AP.) In the 2014–15 school year, students from Grades 4–7 in the south will be attending Louis Riel Junior High School, already home to a science program, and students in the regular program there will be moved to Nellie McClung and John Ware. Students at John Ware will be phased out: eighth grade GATE will end in June 2015, and ninth grade GATE will end in 2016, while GATE will be expanding to Grade 9 at Louis Riel by September 2016. Prior to John Ware, the GATE program was housed at Elboya. A large number of teachers from Nellie McClung and John Ware will be moving to the new location, which was picked to deal with student population issues and to concentrate resources. Notable alumni of the CBE GATE Program include the 36th mayor of Calgary, Naheed Nenshi, from Queen Elizabeth High School.

Westmount Charter School in Calgary is a K-12 charter school specifically dedicated to gifted education.

In British Columbia, the Vancouver Board of Education's gifted program is called Multi-Age Cluster Class or MACC.[1] This is a full-time program for highly gifted elementary students from grades 4 to 7. Through project-based learning, students are challenged to use higher order thinking skills. Another focus of the program is autonomous learning; students are encouraged to self-monitor, self-reflect and seek out enrichment opportunities. Entrance to the program is initiated through referral followed by a review by a screening committee. IQ tests are used but not exclusively. Students are also assessed by performance, cognitive ability tests, and motivation. There are 4 MACCs in Vancouver: grade 4/5 and grade 6/7 at Sir William Osler Elementary, grade 5/6/7 at Tecumseh Elementary, and a French Immersion grade 5/6/7 at Kerrisdale Elementary.

At a lower scale, in Ontario, the Peel District School Board operates its Regional Enhanced Program at The Woodlands School, Lorne Park Secondary School, Glenforest Secondary School, Heart Lake Secondary School and Humberview Secondary School to provide students an opportunity to develop and explore skills in a particular area of interest. Students identified as gifted (which the PDSB classifies as "enhanced") may choose to attend the nearest of these high schools instead of their assigned home high school. In the Regional Enhanced Program, enhanced students take core courses (primarily, but not limited to English, mathematics, and the sciences) in an environment surrounded by fellow enhanced peers. The classes often contain modified assignments that encourage students to be creative.

Hong Kong

Definition of giftedness 
The Education Commission Report No.4 issued in 1990 recommended a policy on gifted education for schools in Hong Kong and suggested that a broad definition of giftedness using multiple criteria should be adopted.

Gifted children generally have exceptional achievement or potential in one or more of the following domains:

a high level of measured intelligence;
specific academic aptitude in a subject area;
creative thinking;
superior talent in visual and performing arts;
natural leadership of peers; and
psychomotor ability - outstanding performance or ingenuity in athletics, mechanical skills or other areas requiring gross or fine motor coordination;

The multi-dimensional aspect of intelligence has been promoted by Professor Howard Gardner from the Harvard Graduate School of Education in his theory of multiple intelligences. In his introduction to the tenth anniversary edition of his classic work Frames of Mind, he says:

In the heyday of the psychometric and behaviorist eras, it was generally believed that intelligence was a single entity that was inherited; and that human beings - initially a blank slate - could be trained to learn anything, provided that it was presented in an appropriate way. Nowadays an increasing number of researchers believe precisely the opposite; that there exists a multitude of intelligences, quite independent of each other; that each intelligence has its own strengths and constraints; that the mind is far from unencumbered at birth; and that it is unexpectedly difficult to teach things that go against early 'naive' theories of that challenge the natural lines of force within an intelligence and its matching domains. (Gardner 1993: xxiii)

Howard Gardner initially formulated a list of seven intelligences, but later added an eighth, that are intrinsic to the human mind: linguistic, logical/mathematical, visual/spatial, musical, bodily kinesthetic, intrapersonal, interpersonal, and naturalist intelligences.
It has become widely accepted at both local and international scales to adopt a broad definition of giftedness using multiple criteria to formulate gifted education policy.

Mission and principles 
The mission of gifted education is to systematically and strategically explore and develop the potential of gifted students. Gifted learners are to be provided with opportunities to receive education at appropriate levels in a flexible teaching and learning environment. 
The guiding principles for gifted education in Hong Kong are:

Nurturing multiple intelligences as a requirement of basic education for all students and an essential part of the mission for all schools
The needs of gifted children are best met within their own schools though it is recognized that opportunities to learn with similarly gifted students are important. Schools have an obligation to provide stimulating and challenging learning opportunities for their students
The identification of gifted students should recognize the breadth of multiple intelligences
Schools should ensure that the social and emotional, as well as the intellectual, needs of gifted children are recognized and met.

Framework 
Based on these guiding principles, a three-tier gifted education framework was adopted in 2000. Levels 1 & 2 are recognised as being school-based whilst Level 3 is the responsibility of the HKAGE. The intention is that Level 1 serves the entire school population, irrespective of ability, that Level 2 deals with between 2-10% of the ability group, and that Level 3 caters for the top 2% of students.
Level 1:
A. To immerse the core elements advocated in gifted education i.e. High-order thinking skills, creativity and personal-social competence in the curriculum for ALL students;
B. To differentiate teaching through appropriate grouping of students to meet the different needs of the groups with enrichment and extension of curriculum across ALL subjects in regular classrooms.
Level 2:
C. To conduct pull-out programmes of generic nature outside the regular classroom to allow systematic training for a homogeneous group of students (e.g. Creativity training, leadership training, etc.);
D. To conduct pull-out programme in specific areas (e.g. Maths, Arts, etc.) outside the regular classroom to allow systematic training for students with outstanding performance in specific domains.
Level 3:
E. Tertiary institutions and other educational organizations / bodies, such as the Hong Kong Academy for Gifted Education and other universities in Hong Kong to provide a wide and increasing range of programmes for gifted students

India 
In India, Jnana Prabodhini Prashala started in 1968, is probably the first school for gifted education. The motto is "motivating intelligence for social change." The school, located in central Pune, admits 80 students each year, after thorough testing, which includes two written papers and an interview. The psychology department of Jnana Prabodhini has worked on J. P. Guilford's model of intelligence.

Iran
NODET was first established in 1976 and re-established in 1987.

Admission to NODET schools is selective and based on a comprehensive nationwide entrance examination procedure.

Every year thousands of students apply to enter the schools, from which less than 5% are chosen for the 99 middle schools and 98 high schools within the country. All applicants must have a minimum GPA of 19 (out of 20) for attending the entrance exam. In 2006, 87,081 boys and 83,596 girls from 56 cities applied, and 6,888 students were accepted for the 2007 middle school classes. The admission process is much more selective in big cities like Tehran, Isfahan, Mashhad and Karaj in which less than 150 students are accepted after two exams and interviews, out of over 50,000 applicants.

The top NODET (and Iranian) schools are Allameh Helli High School and Shahid Madani High School (in Tabriz), Farzanegan High School located in Tehran, Shahid Ejei High School located in Isfahan, Shahid Hashemi Nejad High School located in Mashhad and Shahid Soltani School located in Karaj. Courses taught in NODET schools are college-level in fields such as biology, chemistry, mathematics, physics and English. The best teachers from the ministry of education are chosen mainly by the school's principal and faculty to teach at NODET schools. Schools mainly have only two majors (normal schools have three majors), math/physics and experimental sciences (like math/physics but with biology as the primary course). Even though social sciences are taught, there is much less emphasis on these subjects due to the lack of interest by both students and the organization.

Norway
Norway has no centre for gifted or talented children or youth. However, there is the privately run Barratt Due Institute of Music which offers musical kindergarten, evening school and college for highly talented young musicians. There is also the public secondary school for talents in ballet at Ruseløkka school in Oslo, which admits the top 15 dancers. In athletics, the privately run Norwegian Elite Sports Gymnasium (NTG) offers secondary school for talents in five locations in Norway. This account might not be complete.

Republic of Ireland
The Centre for the Talented Youth of Ireland has run in Dublin City University since 1992.

South Korea
Following the Gifted Education Promotion Law in the year 2000, the Ministry of Education, Science, and Technology (MEST) founded the National Research Center for Gifted and Talented Education (NRCGTE) in 2002 to ensure effective implementation of gifted education research, development, and policy. The center is managed by the Korean Educational Development Institute (KEDI). Presently twenty-five universities conduct gifted and talented education research in some form; for example, Seoul National University is conducting Science-gifted Education Center, and KAIST is conducting Global Institute For Talented Education (GIFTED), the Korean Society for the Gifted and Talented and the Korean Society for the Gifted.

Education for the scientifically gifted in Korea can be traced back to the 1983 government founding of Gyeonggi Science High School. Following three later additions (Korea Science Academy of KAIST, Seoul Science High School and Daegu Science High School), approximately 1,500, or 1 in 1,300 (0.08 percent) of high school students are currently enrolled among its four gifted academies. By 2008, about 50,000, or 1 in 140 (0.7 percent) of elementary and middle school students participated in education for the gifted. In 2005, a program was undertaken to identify and educate gifted children of socioeconomically underprivileged people. Since then, more than 1,800 students have enrolled in the program.

Gradually the focus has expanded over time to cover informatics, arts, physical education, creative writing, humanities, and social sciences, leading to the 2008 creation of the government funded Korean National Institute for the Gifted Arts. To pluralize the need for trained professional educators, teachers undergo basic training (60 hours), advanced training (120 hours), and overseas training (60 hours) to acquire skills necessary to teach gifted youth.

Singapore

In Singapore, the Gifted Education Programme (GEP) was introduced in 1984 and is offered in the upper primary years (Primary 4–6, ages 10–12). Pupils undergo rigorous testing in Primary 3 (age 9) for admission into the GEP for Primary 4 to 6. About 1% of the year's cohort are admitted into the programme. The GEP is offered at selected schools, meaning that these pupils attend school alongside their peers in the mainstream curriculum but attend separate classes for certain subjects. As of the 2016 academic year, there are 9 primary schools which offer the GEP.

Slovakia
The School for Gifted Children in Bratislava was established in 1998. It offers education known as APROGEN—Alternative Program for Gifted Education.

Turkey
The UYEP Research and Practice Center offers enriched programs for gifted students at Anadolu University. The center was founded by Ugur Sak in 2007. ANABILIM Schools have special classrooms for gifted and talented students. These schools apply the differentiated curriculum in the sciences, mathematics, language arts, social studies, and the arts for K8 gifted and talented students and enriched science and project-based learning in high school. There are over 200 science and art centers operated by the Ministry of Education that offer special education for gifted and talented students throughout the country. The Ministry uses the Anadolu Sak Intelligence Scale (ASIS)  and the Wechsler Scales to select students for these centers. Four universities offer graduate programs in gifted education.

United Kingdom
In England, schools are expected to identify 5-10% of students who are gifted and/or talented in relation to the rest of the cohort in that school—an approach that is pragmatic (concerned with ensuring schools put in place some provision for their most able learners) rather than principled (in terms of how to best understand giftedness). The term gifted applies to traditional academic subjects, and talented is used in relation to high levels of attainment in the creative arts and sports. The National Academy for Gifted and Talented Youth ran from 2002 to 2007 at the University of Warwick. Warwick University decided not to reapply for the contract to run NAGTY in 2007, instead introducing its own programme, the International Gateway for Gifted Youth in 2008. In January 2010, the government announced that NAGTY was to be scrapped the following month.

United States
In the United States, each state department of education determines if the needs of gifted students will be addressed as a mandatory function of public education. If so, the state determines the definition of which students will be identified and receive services, but may or may not determine how they shall receive services. If a state does not consider gifted education mandatory, individual districts may, thus the definition of what gifted is varies from state or district.

In contrast with special education, gifted education is not regulated on a federal level, although recommendations by the US Department of Education are offered. As such, funding for services is not consistent from state to state, and although students may be identified, the extent to which they receive services can vary widely depending upon a state or district's budget.

Although schools with higher enrollment of minority or low-income students are just as likely to offer gifted programs as other schools, differing enrollment rates across racial and ethnic groups has raised concerns about equity in gifted education in the U.S.

Gifted education programs are also offered at various private schools. For example, the Mirman School caters to children with an IQ of 138 and above and Prep for Prep is focused on students of color.

Commonly used terms 
Source: National Association for Gifted Children—Frequently Used Terms in Gifted Education

Affective curriculum: A curriculum that is designed to teach gifted students about emotions, self-esteem, and social skills. This can be valuable for all students, especially those who have been grouped with much older students, or who have been rejected by their same-age, but academically typical, peers.

Differentiation: modification of a gifted student's curriculum to accommodate their specific needs. This may include changing the content or ability level of the material.

Heterogeneous grouping: a strategy that groups students of varied ability, preparedness, or accomplishment in a single classroom environment. Usually this terminology is applied to groupings of students in a particular grade, especially in elementary school. For example, students in fifth grade would be heterogeneously grouped in math if they were randomly assigned to classes instead of being grouped by demonstrated subject mastery. Heterogeneous grouping is sometimes claimed to provide a more effective instructional environment for less prepared students.

Homogeneous grouping: a strategy that groups students by specific ability, preparedness, or interest within a subject area. Usually this terminology is applied to groupings of students in a particular grade, especially in elementary school. For example, students in fifth grade would be homogeneously grouped in math if they were assigned to classes based on demonstrated subject mastery rather than being randomly assigned. Homogeneous grouping can provide more effective instruction for the most prepared students.

Individualized Education Program (IEP): a written document that addresses a student's specific individual needs. It may specify accommodations, materials, or classroom instruction. IEPs are often created for students with disabilities, who are required by law to have an IEP when appropriate. Most states are not required to have IEPs for students who are only identified as gifted. Some students may be intellectually gifted in addition to having learning and/or attentional disabilities, and may have an IEP that includes, for instance, enrichment activities as a means of alleviating boredom or frustration, or as a reward for on-task behavior. In order to warrant such an IEP, a student needs to be diagnosed with a separate emotional or learning disability that is not simply the result of being unchallenged in a typical classroom. These are also known as Individual Program Plans, or IPPs.

Justification
Researchers and practitioners in gifted education contend that, if education were to follow the medical maxim of "first, do no harm," then no further justification would be required for providing resources for gifted education as they believe gifted children to be at-risk. The notion that gifted children are "at-risk" was publicly declared in the Marland Report in 1972:

Three decades later, a similar statement was made by researchers in the field:

Controversies
Controversies concerning gifted education are varied and often highly politicized. They are as basic as agreeing upon the appropriateness of the term 'gifted' or the definition of 'giftedness'. For example, does 'giftedness' refer to performance or potential (such as inherent intelligence)? Many students do not exhibit both at the same time.

Measures of general intelligence also remain controversial. Early IQ tests were notorious for producing higher IQ scores for privileged races and classes and lower scores for disadvantaged subgroups. Although IQ tests have changed substantially over the past half century, and many objections to the early tests have been addressed by 'culture neutral' tests (such as the Raven test), IQ testing remains controversial. Regardless of the tests used to identify children for gifted programs, many school districts in the United States still have disproportionately more White and Asian American students enrolled in their gifted programs, while Hispanic and African American students are usually underrepresented. However, research shows that this may be not be a fault of tests, but rather a result of the achievement gap in the United States.

Some schools and districts only accept IQ tests as evidence of giftedness. This brings scrutiny to the fact that many affluent families can afford to consult with an educational psychologist to test their children, whereas families with a limited income cannot afford the test and must depend on district resources.

Appropriateness of forms of gifted education
This is the most hotly debated aspect of gifted education. Some people believe that gifted education resources lack availability and flexibility. They feel that in the alternative methods of gifted education, the gifted students "miss out" on having a "normal" childhood, at least insofar as "normal childhood" is defined as attending school in a mixed-ability classroom. Others believe that gifted education allows gifted students to interact with peers that are on their level, be adequately challenged, and leaves them better equipped to take on the challenges of life.

Another facet of this controversy is the effectiveness of the programs dependent upon resources that are pushed more toward students who are struggling. Gifted Education is not mandated in many states, making it elective for districts to earmark money for. Many lower-achieving districts and schools must make crisis decisions on programs that are not high priorities. As a result, gifted students at these schools are not served, or not served effectively.

Class and ethnicity
Gifted programs are often seen as being elitist in places where the majority of students receiving gifted services are from a privileged background. Identifying and serving gifted children from poverty presents unique challenges, ranging from emotional issues arising from a family's economic insecurity, to gaps in pre-school cognitive development due to the family's lack of education and time.

In New York City experience has shown that basing admission to gifted and talented programs on tests of any sort can result in selection of substantially more middle-class and white or Asian students and development of more programs in schools that such students attend.

Emotional aspects
While giftedness is seen as an academic advantage, psychologically it can pose other challenges for the gifted individual. A person who is intellectually advanced may or may not be advanced in other areas. Each individual student needs to be evaluated for physical, social, and emotional skills without the traditional prejudices which prescribe either "compensatory" weaknesses or "matching" advancement in these areas.

It is a common misconception that gifted students are universally gifted in all areas of academics, and these misconceptions can have a variety of negative emotional effects on a gifted child. Unrealistically high expectations of academic success are often placed on gifted students by both parents and teachers. This pressure can cause gifted students to experience high levels of anxiety, to become perfectionists, and to develop a fear of failure. Gifted students come to define themselves and their identity through their giftedness, which can be problematic as their entire self-concept can be shaken when they do not live up to the unrealistically high expectations of others.
 
A person with significant academic talents often finds it difficult to fit in with schoolmates. These pressures often wane during adulthood, but they can leave a significant negative impact on emotional development.

Social pressures can cause children to "play down" their intelligence in an effort to blend in with other students. "Playing down" is a strategy often used by students with clinical depression and is seen somewhat more frequently in socially acute adolescents. This behavior is usually discouraged by educators when they recognize it. Unfortunately, the very educators who want these children to challenge themselves and to embrace their gifts and talents are often the same people who are forced to discourage them in a mixed-ability classroom, through mechanisms like refusing to call on the talented student in class so that typical students have an opportunity to participate.

Students who are young, enthusiastic or aggressive are more likely to attract attention and to disrupt the class by working ahead, giving the correct answers all the time, asking for new assignments, or finding creative ways to entertain themselves while the rest of the class finishes an assignment. This behavior can be mistaken for ADHD. 

Many parents of gifted find that it is the social-emotional aspect of their children's lives that needs support. Schools and talent development programs often focus on academic enrichment rather than providing time for gifted children to have the social interaction with true peers that is required for healthy development. National organizations such as Supporting Emotional Needs of the Gifted (SENG) as well as local organizations, have emerged in an effort to meet these needs.

It can also happen that some unidentified gifted students will get bored in regular class, daydream and lose track of where the class is in a lecture, and the teacher becomes convinced that the student is slow and struggling with the material.

Finally, gifted and talented students are statistically somewhat more likely to be diagnosed with a mental disorder such as bipolar disorder and to become addicted to drugs or alcohol. Gifted and talented students also have a higher chance of co-occurring learning disability. Gifted students with learning disabilities are often called twice exceptional. These students can require special attention in school.

Gender

Another area of controversy has been the marginalization of gifted females with studies attributing it to self-efficacy, acculturation and biological differences in aptitude between boys and girls for advanced mathematics.

Test preparation
In the United States, particularly in New York City where qualifying children as young as four are enrolled in enriched kindergarten classes offered by the public schools, a test preparation industry has grown up which closely monitors the nature of tests given to prospective students of gifted and talented programs. This can result in admission of significant numbers of students into programs who lack superior natural intellectual talent and exclusion of naturally talented students who did not participate in test preparation or lacked the resources to do so.

It is virtually impossible to train a child for a WISC test or other gifted test. Some websites are known for publishing test questions and answers, although using these is considered illegal since it is highly confidential information. It would also be disastrous if a non-gifted student was placed in a gifted program. Reviewing actual test questions can confuse children and stifles their natural thinking process, however reviewing similar style questions is a possibility.

Private gifted assessment is usually expensive and educators recommend that parents take advantage of online screening tests to give a preliminary indication of potential giftedness. Another way to screen for giftedness before requesting a psychological assessment is to do a curriculum-based assessment. Curriculum-based assessment is a form of achievement testing that focuses specifically on what the child has been exposed to in their academic career. It can be done through school or a private educational center. Although this can determine if a child's performance in school potentially signifies giftedness, there are complications. For example, if a child changes school districts or country of residence, the different terminology of curriculum could hold that child back. Secondly, discrepancies between school districts, along with public and private education, create a very wide range of potential knowledge bases.

Scholarly Journals
 Advance Academics
 Gifted Child Quarterly
 Gifted Education International
 Gifted and Talented International
 High Ability Studies
 Journal for the Education of the Gifted
 Roeper Review

See also

List of gifted and talented programmes
Academic elitism
Special education
Rationale for gifted programs
Selective schools
Discrimination of excellence

Notes

Further reading
 The latest research about gifted education can be found in the academic journals that specialize in gifted education: Gifted Child Quarterly, Journal of Advanced Academics, Journal for the Education of the Gifted, Roeper Review. 
 Assouline, S., and A. Lupkowski-Shoplik (2005). Developing Math Talent: A Guide for Educating Gifted And Advanced Learners in Math. Waco, TX: Prufrock Press .
 Broecher, J. (2005). Hochintelligente kreativ begaben. LIT-Verlag Muenster, Hamburg 2005 (Application of the High/Scope Approach and Renzulli's Enrichment Triad Model to a German Summer Camp for the Gifted)
 Davidson, Jan and Bob, with Vanderkam, Laura (2004). Genius Denied: How to Stop Wasting Our Brightest Young Minds. New York, NY: Simon and Schuster.
 Davis, G., and S. Rimm (1989). Education of the Gifted and Talented (2nd edn). Englewood Cliffs, NJ: Prentice Hall.
 Hansen, J., and S. Hoover (1994). Talent Development: Theories and Practice. Dubuque, IA: Kendall Hunt.
 Johnsen, S. (1999, November/ December). "The top 10 events in gifted education". Gifted Child Today, 22(6), 7.
 Newland, T. (1976). The Gifted in Historical Perspective. Englewood Cliffs, NJ: Prentice Hall.
 Piirto, J. (1999). Talented Adults and Children: Their Development and Education (3rd edn). Waco, TX,: Prufrock Press.
 Rogers, Karen B. (2002). Re-forming Gifted Education: How Parents and Teachers Can Match the Program to the Child. Scottsdale, AZ: Great Potential Press.
 Winebrenner, Susan. (2001). Teaching Gifted Kids in the Regular Classroom. Minneapolis, MN: Free Spirit Publishing.
 Lib Ed, UK-based online formerly paper) magazine opposed to authoritarian schooling: article "High Learning Potential" (2013).
 U.S. Department of Education, Office of Educational Research and Improvement. (1993). National Excellence: A case for developing America's talent. Washington, DC: U.S. Government Printing Office.

External links
Hoagies' Gifted Education Page
The Relationship of Grouping Practices to the Education of the Gifted and Talented Learner.
Myths About Gifted Students
"Raising an Accidental Prodigy from The Wall Street Journal on choices parents of gifted children make about their education

 
Alternative education
School terminology